Assuwa was a confederation of 22 states in western Anatolia around 1400 BC. The confederation formed to oppose the Hittite Empire, but was defeated under Tudhaliya I/II. The name was recorded in various centres in Mycenaean Greece as Asiwia, which latter acquired the form Asia.

History

Assuwa appears in the historical record around 1400 BC. It is mentioned in six surviving Hittite documents including the Annals of Tudhaliya I/II, which gives a detailed account of the Assuwans' rebellion and its aftermath.

Circumstantial evidence raises the possibility that Ahhiyawans may have supported the rebellion. For instance, a Mycenaean-style sword found at Hattusa bears an inscription suggesting that it was taken from an Assuwan soldier and left as an offering to the Hittite storm god. Some scholars have speculated that certain details in the Iliad could reflect a memory of this conflict, including the seemingly anachronistic character of Ajax as well as references to pre-Trojan War escapades of Bellerophon and Heracles in Anatolia.

Assuwa has been identified in Egyptian records as isy and a-si-ja and in the Linear B demonym a-si-ja

References

See also

Arzawa
Ancient regions of Anatolia
Seha River Land
Wilusa

States and territories established in the 15th century BC
States and territories disestablished in the 14th century BC
 
Trojan War
Former confederations